Oreana Peak is a summit in the U.S. state of Nevada.

Oreana Peak was named for its deposits of ore.

References

Mountains of Douglas County, Nevada